Argument from analogy or false analogy is a special type of inductive argument, whereby perceived similarities are used as a basis to infer some further similarity that has yet to be observed.  Analogical reasoning is one of the most common methods by which human beings attempt to understand the world and make decisions.  When a person has a bad experience with a product and decides not to buy anything further from the producer, this is often a case of analogical reasoning.  It is also implicit in much of science; for instance, experiments on laboratory rats typically proceed on the basis that some physiological similarities between rats and humans entails some further similarity (e.g. possible reactions to a drug).

Structure 
The process of analogical inference involves noting the shared properties of two or more things, and from this basis inferring that they also share some further property.  The structure or form may be generalized like so:

 P and Q are similar in respect to properties a, b, and c.
 P has been observed to have further property x.
 Therefore, Q probably has property x also.

The argument does not assert that the two things are identical, only that they are similar.  The argument may provide us with good evidence for the conclusion, but the conclusion does not follow as a matter of logical necessity.  Determining the strength of the argument requires that we take into consideration more than just the form: the content must also come under scrutiny.

Analyzing arguments from analogy

Strength of an analogy

Several  affect the strength of the argument from analogy:
 The  (positive or negative) of the known similarities to the similarity inferred in the conclusion.
 The  of relevant similarity (or dissimilarity) between the two objects.

Counterarguments

Arguments from analogy may be attacked by use of disanalogy, counteranalogy, and by pointing out unintended consequences of an analogy.  In order to understand how one might go about analyzing an argument from analogy, consider the teleological argument and the criticisms of this argument put forward by the philosopher David Hume.

According to the analogical reasoning in the teleological argument, it would be ridiculous to assume that a complex object such as a watch came about through some random process. Since we have no problem at all inferring that such objects must have had an intelligent designer who created it for some purpose, we ought to draw the same conclusion for another complex and apparently designed object: the universe.

Hume argued that the universe and a watch have many relevant dissimilarities; for instance, the universe is often very disorderly and random. This is the strategy of "disanalogy": just as the amount and variety of relevant similarities between two objects strengthens an analogical conclusion, so do the amount and variety of relevant dissimilarities weaken it.  Creating a "counteranalogy," Hume argued that some natural objects seem to have order and complexity — snowflakes for example — but are not the result of intelligent direction.  But then just as the snowflake's order and complexity itself might not have direction, the causes of the order and complexity might.  So this would be an example of disproof by begging the question.  Finally, Hume provides many possible "unintended consequences" of the argument; for instance, given that objects such as watches are often the result of the labor of groups of individuals, the reasoning employed by the teleological argument would seem to lend support to polytheism.

False analogy

A false analogy is a faulty instance of the argument from analogy.

An argument from analogy is weakened if it is inadequate in any of the above respects. The term "false analogy" comes from the philosopher John Stuart Mill, who was one of the first individuals to engage in a detailed examination of analogical reasoning. One of Mill's examples involved an inference that some person is lazy from the observation that his or her sibling is lazy. According to Mill, sharing parents is not all that relevant to the property of laziness (although this in particular is an example of a faulty generalization rather than a false analogy).

Examples
A basic example:

 Planets in a solar system orbit a star. 
 Electrons in an atom orbit a nucleus, and electrons jump instantly from orbit to orbit.
 Therefore, planets in a solar system jump instantly from orbit to orbit.

This is a false analogy because it fails to account for the relevant differences between a solar system and an atom.

See also

 Case-based reasoning
 Casuistry
 
 Defeasible reasoning
 Jurisprudence
 Problem of induction

References 

Inductive fallacies
Analogy
Inductive reasoning
Philosophical arguments